The Martinsville Dam is a gravity dam on the Smith River in Martinsville, Virginia. The dam was completed in 1924 and houses a 1.3 MW power plant which supplies power to the city of Martinsville. Before the current dam, there was a mill dam in its location. The dam and power plant are operated by the Martinsville Electric Department.

References

Dams in Virginia
Dams completed in 1924
Hydroelectric power plants in Virginia
Energy infrastructure completed in 1924
Gravity dams
1924 establishments in Virginia